Claude Ponticelli, known as Claude Ponti, was born on November 22, 1948, in Lunéville (Lorraine, France). He is a children's author and illustrator. His books are famous for the fanciful graphic design, but also for the imaginative and poetic stories. Thus, he was and still is an iconic and complete artist, with his unique and distinctive universe.

Biography 
Claude Ponti's father was a « chrono-analyser », and his mother was a teacher. He got his diploma in 1967. He attended Aix-en-Provence art school, and then moved into literature and archaeology studies.

He became a press cartoonist, from 1968 to 1984, for a French newspaper. He exposed his works in Paris from 1972 to 1978. Also, he gave some illustrations to the children literature editor. He was the artistic director of the Imagerie of Epinal.

The birth of his daughter, Adèle, in 1985, was the trigger to his career as children's author. At the beginning, his works was destined for his child. The first one, Adele's Album, was published in 1986 by Gallimard. After this, most of his books are published by l’École des Loisirs.

In 2009, he created « Le Muz », an online virtual museum, which shows works of children from the entire world.

Claude Ponti writes novels for adults too, even if he's more known for his children's author works.

Works

Writing Content 
Claude Ponti creates stories which are articulated like dreams, often with a touch of humour.

He frequently invents new words, inspired by kids (bad pronunciation, or their imaginations). He also plays with the language, by the use of subtle and poetic puns. Hence, especially in its last album, the content is both for kids and adults.

Puns contribute to the writing dynamic, and characters are created with ideas associations. The whole book, story and images, is a base to imagine and create new psychological interpretations. Besides, a lot of books tells the adventure of characters who live initiatory journeys.

Ponti says those words about his books :

« My stories are like tales, always in the fantasy, they’re talk about the « inside life » and childhood feelings, so each child can put what he want into the images : dreams and characters of his own. »

Visual Content 
In Ponti's albums, text is tied to images. The gorgeous illustrations are full-blown elements, symbolics and independents. The attentive reader can discover details, easter eggs, hidden messages, or facts that are not mentioned is the text.

Inspirations 
Claude Ponti is notably inspired by Lewis Carroll's wacky universe, and introduces references to Alice's Adventures in Wonderland and Through the Looking-Glass in his own books.

Furthermore, children's imagination inspired him, their ideas, their wishes, to create appreciated books :

« When my daughter had a dream or a nightmare, the next day, I asked her to tell me about it, I was taking notes then I went to my office, and I worked. »

Renown

«An important children’s author and illustrator» 
According to Anne Dupin,

« Claude Ponti is to my mind a vital author in the whole children’s production,  including the abundant creativity and the fanciful graphic nearly brings kids infatuation. His universe, with these multiple artistic and cultural references, themes and a languages proper to the childhood, his originality through forms, colors, typography, or pagination, brings narrative content that suits to the children’s emotional, and their expectations. They can find a new knowledge or word, which let them choose easily their destinies. »

International 
Nowadays, Claude Ponti's albums are translated into 13 languages, of which English, Spanish, Deutsch, Greek, Swedish. Russian publishing houses start to pay attention to the author, whereas Chinese and Korean people are nearly fanatical concerning him.

Isabelle Darthy, who publish the author for 1990 says :

« Claude Ponti is a headache to his translators. « Even in French, plenty of things  are missed, the reader must read a second or a third time to understand. The albums aimed to the international public needs pretty good translations, because Claude Ponti's puns and expressions are complex and often subtle. Translate those books required very experimented translators, and even fans of the author. »

Bibliography 
 Adele's Album (1986)
 Ma Vallée (1989)
Albums pour petits et grands[modifier | modifier le code]
Sauf mention contraire, les albums ont été publiés par L'École des loisirs. 
L’Album d’Adèle, Gallimard jeunesse, 1986.
Adèle s’en mêle, Gallimard, 1987.
La Colère de Monsieur Dubois, Gallimard, 1987.
Adèle et la pelle, Gallimard, 1988.
La Lune, la Grenouille et le Noir, Gallimard, 1989.
Pétronille et ses 120 petits, 1990.
Blaise et la tempêteuse bouchée, 1991.
Le jour du mange-poussin, 1991.
Blaise dompteur de taches, 1992.
L'arbre sans fin, 1992.
Paris, 1992.
Okilélé, 1993.
La Tempête (illustrations), texte de Florence Seyvos, 1993.
La Fenêtre, 1993.
Les Épinards, 1993.
La Voiture, 1993.
Blaise et le robinet, 1994.
Parci et Parla, 1994.
Dans la pomme, 1994.
Dans le gant, 1994.
Dans le loup, 1994.
Derrière la poussette, 1994.
Sur le lit, 1994.
L'Écoute-aux-portes, 1995.
Le Bébé bonbon, 1995.
Les Masques, 1995.
La boîte, 1995.
Le Chien invisible, 1995.
Sur la branche, 1996.
Dans la voiture, 1996.
Au fond du jardin, 1996.
Le Tournemire, 1996.
Zénobie, 1997.
Le Nakakoué, 1997.
Le Nuage, 1998.
Le A, 1998.
Le Cauchemar, 1998.
Ma vallée, 1998.
Bizarre... Bizarre, 1999.
Les Chaussures neuves, 1999.
Le Chapeau à secrets, 1999.
Une semaine de Monsieur Monsieur, 1999.
Sur l'île des Zertes, 1999.
Le Doudou méchant, 2000.
Le petit Frère, 2001.
Le Chien et le Chat, 2001.
Le Non, 2001.
Georges Lebanc, 2001.
Petit Prince Pouf (illustrations), texte d'Agnès Desarthe, 2002.
Schmélele et l'Eugénie des larmes, 2002.
La Revanche de Lili Prune, 2003.
Les Montres molles, 2004.
Le Réfrigogérateur, 2004.
Un thé d'été, 2004.
Blaise et le château d'Anne Hiversère, 2004.
Mille secrets de poussins, 2005.
La Nuit des Zèfirottes, 2006.
Almanach Ouroulboulouck, 2007.
Catalogue de parents pour les enfants qui veulent en changer, 2008.
Bih-Bih et le Bouffron-Gouffron, 2009.
Tromboline et Foulbazar: Dans rien, 2009.
Tromboline et Foulbazar : L'avion, 2009.
Sœurs et frères, 2010.
Mô-Namour, 2011.
La Venture d’Isée, 2012.
L’Avie d’Isée, 2014.
Blaise et le kontrôleur de Kastatroffe, 20147.
L'Affreux moche Salétouflaire et les Ouloums-Pims, 2015.
Le Mystère des Nigmes, 2016
La course en livre, 2017
Le fleuve, 2018
Mouha, 2019
Romans pour adultes[modifier | modifier le code]
Les Pieds-Bleus, Éditions de l'Olivier, 1995.
Est-ce qu'hier n'est pas fini ?, Éditions de l'Olivier, 1999.
Le monde, et inversement, Éditions de l'Olivier, 2006.
Questions d'importance, publie.net, 2011
Romans pour enfants[modifier | modifier le code]
Broutille, L'École des loisirs, collection Mouche, 1991.
Pochée (Illustrations), textes de Florence Seyvos, L'École des loisirs, collection Mouche, 1994.
Zénobie, L'École des loisirs, collection Neuf, 1997.
Théâtre[modifier | modifier le code]
La Trijolie 1 - La Pantoufle, L'École des loisirs, 2006.
La Trijolie 2 - Bonjour - Où sont les mamans ?, L'École des loisirs, 2006.
La Table, publie.net, 2011
Pluie Visage Soleil, L'École des loisirs, 2016

References 

1948 births
Living people
People from Lunéville
French children's book illustrators
French children's writers